The Northern Regional Health Authority (NRHA) is the governing body responsible for healthcare delivery and regulation for the Northern Health Region (NHR)—specifically northern Manitoba, excluding Churchill.  

It was formed in 2012 by the merger of the former NOR-MAN and Burntwood Regional Health Authorities.  

Within the region, there are 2 cities, 6 towns, 1 rural municipality, 1 local government district, and numerous unorganized territories made up of hamlets and cottage settlements; as well as 26 First Nations communities and 16 Northern Affairs communities. The NRHA maintains offices in each of its three major centres: Flin Flon, The Pas, and Thompson.

Communities 
Accounting for just below 6% of the provincial population, the Northern Health Region has a population of 74,175 people.

The region has a young population with a median age of 26 (compared to Manitoba at 37), and nearly one in three residents (30%) of the region are under the age of 15 (compared to 19% of Manitoba residents). Contrastly, 6.1% of Northern Region residents are age 65 and older (compared to 14.1% of Manitobans).

Within the region, there are:

 2 cities (Thompson and Flin Flon)
 6 towns (The Pas, Gillam, Grand Rapids, Leaf Rapids, Lynn Lake, and Snow Lake)
 1 rural municipality (Kelsey)
 1 local government district (Mystery Lake)
 26 First Nations communities 
 16 Northern Affairs communities
 Numerous unorganized territories made up of hamlets and cottage settlements (e.g. Norway House)

Indigenous communities 
The NRHA serves 26 First Nations communities, or 'reserves'. According to Manitoba Health's 2012 census, about 40% of the region's residents live on reserves while the remaining 60% live off-reserve.

However, residents frequently travel on and off reserve and access health services in both locations. In addition to issues of gaps in patient follow-ups and on-going continuity of care, having more than one health-services provider—First Nation Inuit Health (FNIH) for on-reserve services and the Region for off-reserve services—can cause confusion among residents in terms of accessing care.

There are over a dozen additional First Nations communities that the NRHA serves; a challenge for the NRHA is that many of these First Nations communities do not have year-round all-weather road access, with many of these First Nations communities relying on rail, boat, and/or air service to travel. This limited access has significant implications on the health of the residents.

Per the 2006 Census, over two-thirds (67.4%) of residents self-identify as "Aboriginal." Residents of the Northern Health Region account for 81% of Manitoba residents who report speaking an Aboriginal language; just below one-third of residents (31.9%) report speaking at least one Aboriginal language compared to only 6% of Manitobans overall.

Facilities 
The NRHA maintains offices in each of its three major centres: Flin Flon, The Pas, and Thompson.

References

Notes

External links

 Government of Manitoba - Regional Health Authorities

Health regions of Manitoba